Harry "Doc" Stephens was an American retired educator and politician from Kansas (July 14, 1942 - August 29, 2020).

Stephens earned a bacherlor's and master's degree in counselor education from Emporia State University, where he was advised by Lloyd Stone. He was a member of Sigma Tau Gamma fraternity, having joined in 1961 while an undergraduate; he served the Delta Chapter of Sigma Tau Gamma at Emporia State University as the lead advisor for 50+ years.  He earned his doctoral degree from the University of Northern Colorado, and then returned to Emporia State where he worked as an administrator.

In 1996, Stephens, a Democratic Party candidate, faced Stone to succeed Jim Lowther as the legislator elected from the 60th Kansas House of Representatives District. Stephens lost, but was later appointed to the Kansas Senate from the 17th district in 1999. Stephens lost reelection to Jim Barnett in 2000.

Stephens died Saturday, August 29, 2020.

References

1942 births
2020 deaths
20th-century American politicians
Democratic Party Kansas state senators
21st-century American politicians
Emporia State University administration
Emporia State University alumni
People from Winfield, Kansas
University of Northern Colorado alumni